Vasil Panayotov (born 16 July 1990) is a Bulgarian professional footballer who plays as a midfielder for Cherno More Varna. Panayotov primarily plays as a centre midfielder.

Career

Club career
Panayotov began his career at Levski Sofia, but he never made a first team appearance. However, he played regularly for the club with the under-19s. Panayotov went on loan to B PFG side Volov Shumen at the start of the 2009–10 season.

In June 2010 he moved to Pirin Gotse Delchev. He scored once in 16 appearances, before moving to Bansko in January 2011.

In June 2016 Panayotov signed with Beroe Stara Zagora but was released in December.

On 16 January 2017, Panayotov signed with Stal Mielec.

On 19 June 2017, Panayotov signed with Levski Sofia.  He left the club at the end of the 2017–18 season when his contract expired.

On 7 August 2018, Panayotov signed with Cherno More for two years. On 17 August, he made his official debut in a 0–0 home draw against Beroe.

International career

On 10 September 2019, he earned his first cap for Bulgaria, coming on as a late second-half substitute for Kristian Dimitrov in the 1–3 away loss against Ireland in a friendly match.

References

External links

Profile at Levskisofia.info

1990 births
Living people
People from Gotse Delchev
Bulgarian footballers
Bulgaria international footballers
Bulgarian expatriate footballers
Association football midfielders
PFC Levski Sofia players
PFC Pirin Gotse Delchev players
FC Bansko players
Ayia Napa FC players
Zawisza Bydgoszcz players
PFC Beroe Stara Zagora players
Stal Mielec players
PFC Cherno More Varna players
First Professional Football League (Bulgaria) players
Second Professional Football League (Bulgaria) players
Cypriot First Division players
I liga players
Bulgarian expatriate sportspeople in Cyprus
Expatriate footballers in Cyprus
Bulgarian expatriate sportspeople in Poland
Expatriate footballers in Poland
Sportspeople from Blagoevgrad Province